Nanorana maculosa (common names: spotted paa frog, Piebald spiny frog) is a species of frog in the family Dicroglossidae. It is endemic to central Yunnan, China, where it occurs in Jingdong County and Shuangbai County. This rare frog inhabits forest streams. It is threatened primarily by collection for human consumption. It is currently protected by the Ailaoshan and Wuliangshan National Nature Reserves.

References

maculosa
Amphibians of China
Endemic fauna of Yunnan
Taxonomy articles created by Polbot
Amphibians described in 1960